The Northern Suburbs Transit System is the name given to the project initiated and funded by the Government of Western Australia to provide high-speed passenger rail services to the northern corridor of metropolitan Perth, the capital city of Western Australia. The project was commenced by the Dowding Labor government in the late 1980s, and its main feature project was the Joondalup railway line and linked bus services, which have been a core component of the Transperth transport network since the line's opening to passengers on 21 March 1993.

The need for the project arose from the rapid and sustained growth of the northern suburbs of Perth during the 1970s and 1980s, which had placed a considerable strain on infrastructure, including the bus system and the Mitchell Freeway. However, prior to the opening of the railway, the proposal was controversial as many in the community believed that upgrading the Mitchell Freeway or providing a guided busway would be better solutions.

The Northern Suburbs Transit System name has been used subsequently for additions to the original line, including the Currambine to Butler extension which was built as far as Clarkson in 2004, and extended to Butler in 2014.

History
The transport needs of Perth's northern corridor were evaluated as far back as 1982, with the preparation of the report Transport 2000 – A Perth Study by the then Office of the Director General of Transport. The report looked at Perth's transport needs into the 21st century and beyond, at a broad strategic level. It provided some strategic travel forecasts, and made a limited evaluation of rapid transit options for the northern corridor.

By the late 1980s, the Mitchell Freeway, along with major arterial routes servicing the northern corridor, were constantly clogged during peak hour, with the community at large dissatisfied with the bus services provided for the region.

The government of the day, after a strong political push, decided to plan and construct a rail service, to known as the Northern Suburbs Rapid Transit System. It was aimed at restructuring the bus network for the northern corridor, while going some way to reduce car dependence in Perth.

The case for rail
As part of research into community attitudes on public transport within the northern corridor, Donovan Research was engaged during 1987 to undertake focus group and telephone research to determine information on the following key points:
 Determine people's overall beliefs and attitudes about and expectations from Transperth;
 Determine major perceived issues of importance related to public transport within the region;
 Ascertain attitudes towards the concept of a transport liaison committee;
 Measure interest in participation in such a committee;
 Obtain specific information as to the various aspects of suggested operation of the committee, such as communications channels used, method of community participation; and
 To obtain specific demographic information from respondents.

The focus groups consisted of two sub-groups of participants, one consisting of public transport users residing within established suburbs, and the other of public transport users from newer and developing suburbs. Combined within these sub-groups were subsets of both regular and irregular users, with regular users being defined as those using public transport at least once per week.

The participants from both sub-groups all held similar views in relation to the public transport; that of bus overcrowding, poor connections, poor timing, and poor route design impacted negatively on their perceptions and opinions of public transport. Over 43% of the participants described the public transport system as it currently stood as either poor or very poor.

Public Transport for Perth’s Northern Suburbs
In its 1986 election campaign platform, the Australian Labor Party stated that "A study will be conducted on the most appropriate form of rapid transit service for the northern suburbs." The study was commenced in early 1988 under the auspices of the then Minister for Transport and Small Business, after receiving Cabinet approval 10 November 1987. Due to the budget position of the then Department of Transport, it was not possible to fund the nine-month project from within its existing budget, which necessitated a request to Treasury for additional funds. The Minister for Budget Management approved the request for additional funding, allocating A$150,000 (1987) for the study.

The study entitled Public Transport for Perth’s Northern Suburbs was completed in September 1988 by consulting firms Travers Morgan, Pack Poy and Kneebone, Blackwell and Associated, and Uloth and Associates. It evaluated a number of rapid transport options for Perth's northern corridor as well as garnering public feedback on those options.

Amongst the methods used to collect data for the report were surveys sent to residents of Beldon, Duncraig, Balga, and Karrinyup, along with previous respondents to a survey initiated through local papers in December 1987.

At the time, members of the then Liberal-National Coalition Opposition, and local community groups, rallied against what they claimed was the lack of the then government's commitment to transport in the northern corridor.

Opposition Leader Barry MacKinnon called on the state government to put plans to construct a new northern suburbs highway on hold, and redirect funds to upgrading and extending the Mitchell Freeway instead.

He also commented that northern suburbs residents faced road journeys of up to an hour to reach the Perth CBD.

This was a view also supported by the then president of the Greenwood, Kingsley, Warwick, and Woodvale Citizens' Association, Cheryl Edwardes (later the Liberal Member for Kingsley and Environment Minister during the Court Government).

Preliminary studies evaluated a number of possible options including:
 Buses on a separate roadway
 Guided busway (similar to the O-bahn in Adelaide)
 Light rail
 Heavy rail
 Automated trains on a guideway
 High-capacity monorail
 Automated people mover systems

The majority of these options were rejected on the basis that introducing another mode of public transport to the city would serve little or no purpose, considering the existing modes of bus and rail functioned effectively.

A number of routes were examined for use as part of the eventual system, which included:
 West Coast Highway
 Mitchell Freeway
 west of the Mitchell Freeway
 east of the Mitchell Freeway
 Wanneroo Road
 Alexander Drive

During the study, various surveys were undertaken to establish public attitudes towards the transport options that were being considered. In order of preference respondents selected electric railway (41%), bus expressway (34.4%), guided busway (19.3%). The most important factors making a selection were faster journeys, and lower capital costs. However, those who preferred the electric railway option cited greater comfort, less crowding, and less pollution as important factors in their preference. In addition, quite a number of respondents liked the railway idea due to it being "forward thinking".

In his response, then Minister for Transport Bob Pearce noted the recommendation by the consultants for the implementation of a bus-based system using an exclusive right-of-way in the median of the Mitchell Freeway. However, he noted that further detailed evaluation of a rail-based option was still being carried out. The report noted that while its preference was to construct a bus expressway, the extension of such a busway beyond Warwick would provide little or no benefits in terms of speed, time, and economics.

During the public debate over the future of public transportation in the northern corridor, Transport Minister Pearce claimed that the NSTS would never be built under a Liberal coalition government. Opposition Leader Barry MacKinnon stated that charge was "totally untrue".

1989 Transport Study
As part of the analysis of a rail service in Perth's northern corridor, a comprehensive study was undertaken in 1989 to establish the best route and potential station options.

The locations of possible station sites included:
 Burns Beach Road (to include park-and-ride space, due to limitations at Joondalup, and rail storage, as well as providing for further extension northward);
 Joondalup;
 Ocean Reef Road;
 Whitfords Avenue;
 Hepburn Avenue;
 Dunwood (named for its location between the suburbs of Duncraig and Greenwood);
 Warwick Bus Station;
 Northern Perimeter Highway (now known as Reid Highway);
 Erindale Road;
 Wishart Street;
 Cedric Street;
 McDonald Street;
 Scarborough Beach Road; and
 Oxford Street.

At the time, a possible deviation of the rail alignment was considered to directly service the suburb of Innaloo. However, this idea was rejected by both the project coordinators and the public at large due to the significant cost, lack of identifiable benefits, and environmental impact.

The study predicted that by 2001, the line would have 13,000 passenger boardings during peak hour. Over 12,000 of these passengers were predicted to board the services prior to reaching the maximum load point, defined by the report as Scarborough Beach Road.

Alternate suggestions
A number of theoretically innovative ideas for possible transport systems were put forward by various people within the Western Australian business and transport communities, but ultimately rejected.

Personal Vehicle Fast Track System
One proposal, from Tom Proctor, Managing Director of Modular Commuting Systems, was for a "Personal Vehicle Fast Track System", in which car-like vehicles travelled automatically, suspended from an overhead beam. The vehicles were then used as electronically driven cars on the road once having reached the end of the track network. Proctor claimed that the system had been selected for use in connecting two shopping centres and other local infrastructure in Campbelltown, New South Wales, but the Acting Deputy Director General was not impressed with the concept having shifted a number of times in conversation and there still not a working prototype in place for evaluation.

Linear induction-based rail system
Retired engineering design consultant, John Stephens, told the Wanneroo Times that a skytrain system using a linear induction motor would be ideal for use along the Mitchell Freeway. He said that the proposed rail line in the middle of the freeway would be an eyesore, and claimed that skytrain systems installed in Vancouver, Toronto, and Boston had been quite successful.

Enabling legislation
State Cabinet gave in-principle support for the construction of a railway and the enabling legislation passed parliament and was assented to on 15 January 1989. The first spike for the line was driven on 14 November 1989, by then Premier Peter Dowding.

Project Scope
While the original project to construct the line was known as the Northern Suburbs Transit System, all subsequent projects involving additions or upgrades to the line have carried the same name.

Original Project

The project was estimated to cost $220 million (1989), including $130 million (1989) for infrastructure including earthworks, bridges, and stations. A further $90 million (1989) would be spent on the purchase of a 22 additional two-car electric trains,now known as the A-series train. The remaining cost of the trains was to be funded from a financing package being drafted by the government.

The proposed rail line would run along the centre of the Mitchell Freeway, and designed to closely link the new rail infrastructure with bus services through the construction of several interchange stations along the route.

The proposed project initially included:
 29.2 km of electric rail line from Perth Station to Joondalup Station;
 The construction of seven stations;
 New footbridges at Oxford Street, Britannia Road and Leeder Street;
 Construction of three road and railway bridges at Vincent, Powis, and Scarborough Beach Roads within the freeway reserve;
 Construction of a new road bridge at Ocean Reef Road;
 Construction of tunnels at Roe Street, Hodges Drive/Joondalup Drive, Collier Pass, Joondalup Drive/Shenton Avenue (Double Segment), and Moore Drive;
 Replacement of existing pedestrian level crossing at Milligan Street with a Pedestrian Bridge;
 Construction of new western concourse at Perth station and appropriate facilities; and
 Passenger Information Systems

Related to the project was the realignment of the Mitchell Freeway between Loftus and McDonald Streets. At the time, the northbound and southbound carriages of the freeway in this section were constructed next to each other. To allow for the rail corridor down the middle of the freeway, that section of road required realignment. While necessary bridges and some associated works for the realignment were included as part of the project cost, the rebuilding of the section of road in the realigned section was funded separately from the project, using regular road funding sources.

Stage One Stations
Stations to be constructed as part of the first stage of the project were:
 Glendalough;
 Stirling;
 Warwick;
 Whitfords;
 Edgewater; and
 Joondalup

The first stage of the project was expected to be operation by the end of 1992.

Stage Two Stations
A station to be constructed as part of the projects second stage was:
 North Joondalup, which later became known as Currambine

The second stage of the project was expected to be in operation by the middle of 1993.

Future Station options
Other possible future stations sites included:
 Oxford Street (which later became known as Leederville);
 Near Wishart Street, Gwelup; and
 Greenwood

Fitzgerald Street Bus Bridge
Already in existence prior to the planning for the line was a level crossing at the intersection of Fitzgerald and Roe streets in central Perth. The crossing allowed buses coming from Wellington Street Bus Station to connect with Fitzgerald Street and then run to the northern and north-eastern suburbs. Due to the need to construct a rail tunnel under Roe Street, it was considered unsafe and impractical to retain the existing level crossing, because it would be situated very near the tunnel entrance, and so make impossible for train drivers to see any vehicles on the crossing and take evasive action. That led to the construction of the Fitzgerald Street Bus Bridge.

Estimated in 1991 to cost $2.88 million, the bridge was designed as a flyover from Roe Street, accommodating two bus lanes, and a shared use path for pedestrian and cycle movements. To construct the bridge, a significant amount of land then occupied by a Perth City Council car park, and a number of buildings, would have to be compulsorily acquired.

However the planned flyover was abandoned in favour of moving the existing level crossing some 250 metres to the west of its original position underneath the Hamilton Interchange approaches. In 2008 construction began on the Perth Arena Bus Bridge, crossing Roes Street, which would offer a similar route to the abandoned Fitzgerald Street option.

Railcar financing
When the project commenced, it was believed that Westrail, then responsible for the provision and management of metropolitan rail transport for Transperth, would not have enough rolling stock to operate the new line. Further to that, the funding available to Westrail would not permit the purchase of rolling stock from current or future operating funds. On 20 November 1989, the State Cabinet allowed Westrail to pursue an operating lease to permit the acquisition of the required 22 2-car A-series trains. On 30 November 1989, the contract to construct the trains was awarded to Walkers-ABB despite a funding deal not being in place. Westrail sought out a financing arrangement to enable the purchase.

In the end, options for the financing of the purchase came down to two companies, Westpac and Allco Leasing. One of the more interesting notes to the Allco proposal was the nature of the financing arrangements it was proposing. At the time of the proposed financing deal, interest rates in Australia were around 16-17%, placing a significant burden on companies in their business dealings. To work around this, Allco proposed a financing structure that involved a cross-border financing arrangement in Japan. It also required the establishment of a special purposes lessor company, incorporated in the Cayman Islands, to minimise withholding tax liabilities from the Japanese and Australian taxation agencies. Allco refused to release specific information on the proposed structure, due to its policy prohibiting the release of specific details of this financing arrangement until it had secured a mandate for their services.

On 29 April 1991, after much deliberation, then Minister for Transport, Pam Beggs, made a recommendation to State Cabinet that the financing package offered by Westpac be accepted. Her recommendation was subsequently approved by Cabinet on 20 May 1991. The final financial facility provided by Westpac was valued in 1991 at over $160 million, to be paid off over a period of 20 years.

However, the establishment of the funding facility was not without significant incident. Substantial argument between the Western Australian Government and Westpac ensued, in respect of liability if Westrail defaulted on payments. Of concern was the recourse Westpac would have against the Western Australian Government Consolidated Revenue Fund, particularly in the context of the Crown Suits Act of 1889 and 1947, if such a default event occurred.

The position of Westpac's lawyers was in direct conflict with that of the Government's legal advisors on the project, Mallesons Stephen Jaques. The Government's lawyers considered that Westpac would have reasonable recourse against the Government, and its Consolidated Revenue Fund, in the event that a default occurred. One solution proposed by Clayton Utz was to enjoin the Minister for Transport as a party to the financing facility contract. However, after further significant problems arose with proposed changes by Westpac to the funding arrangements, its contract for the finance facility was terminated in August 1992.

Currambine to Clarkson Extension
In 2000, the Department of Transport released the report from the Urban Rail Planning and Implementation Steering Committee outlining plans for the extension of the line from Currambine to Clarkson, and its continuation to a new railway depot to be located at Nowergup, within the future Mitchell Freeway reserve. This was the result of a commitment from the then Court Liberal Government that it would extend the Joondalup Line from Currambine to Clarkson during its term of government. The report was initiated following the completion of the South West Metropolitan Railway (SWMR) Master Plan, which was the basis of the Mandurah railway line and associated works.

Estimated in 2001 to cost $81 million, the report recommended the undertaking of the following works to complete the project:
 The amendment of the Metropolitan Region Scheme to excise 202 hectares of land from the adjoining Neerabup National Park, while returning some 572 hectares to the park in the same adjustment;
 Acquisition of relevant lands, funded from the 2000/2001 state budget;
 The construction of a new Currambine Station to a location in the middle of the Mitchell Freeway reserve, along with associated approach works;
 Demolition of the existing Currambine Station, including associated sidings and rolling-stock cleaning facilities;
 Construction of the Clarkson Station and associated works;
 Construction of a rail bridge at Burns Beach Road;
 Construction of a road bridge at Hester Avenue;
 Construction of a new rail depot at Nowergup;
 Construction of the rail reserve and four kilometres of railway track from Burns Beach Road to Nowgerup, along with associated works including communications and signalling;
 Lengthening existing station platforms along the line to 144 metres to accommodate 6-car trains; and
 The purchase and delivery of new rolling stock at a cost of $23 million (2000).

The plan also recommended a delay in the construction of Greenwood Station, because it could not be adequately serviced until additional rolling stock had been delivered.

The project was to be funded from government borrowings over four years from 2001 to 2004.

The supply of additional rolling stock was critical to the completion of the project, particularly in the context of the future planned rail needs for Perth. Existing rolling stock was being utilised to capacity, and based on future projections, that included the operation of a fifth railway line and passenger numbers modelling, the size of the existing fleet would not be able to cope.

Relocation of Currambine Station
At the time of the project's proposal, there was significant community discussion relating to the relocation of the Currambine Station into the middle of the freeway reserve. In the 1989 master plan, the location of the station was designed to reduce the 'transfer penalty' in moving from train to bus/car, and to better integrate with the surrounding suburb.

The committee took these factors into account in its final report, and noted that the relocation was seen as having major environmental and social benefits. Improved frequency, journey speed, and reliability would be more significant factors than an additional  walk. Passenger modelling found that the relocation to the station would have no effect on project passenger boardings.

The relocation would also help retain consistency with rest of the line and the future SWMR. It was further supported in surveys and opinion polls undertaken in Glen Iris, South Lakes and Atwell and with commercial business as part of SWMR planning processes.

If the railway station and subsequent rail reserve had remained on the western side of the freeway, there would have been significantly increased expenditure because of the need for additional noise reduction measures and other engineering works.

New Railway Depot
While Nowergup was selected as the final site for the planned railway depot, Neerabup was suggested as the original site. The environmental assessment recommended that the depot be relocated to a site in Nowergup to lower the environmental impact while retaining larger areas of the park in pristine condition.

Parking and Facilities
One of the other major problems noted in the report was the availability of parking at stations along the line. One of the key features of the Greenwood Station was to be additional parking, which would remove any need to construct a multi-story parking facility at Whitfords and Warwick Stations. That was in addition to the construction of a further 240 car parking bays at Whitfords Station, costing $780,000 in 2000, on the southern side of the station. Construction of a multi-story parking structure at Warwick was not considered as an option due to a number of social and environmental concerns.

Clarkson to Butler extension
In 2008, the state government announced a further  extension to the line, taking it as far as the northern suburb of Butler. Previously, Alannah MacTiernan, the Planning and Infrastructure Minister, had announced that funds of $2.1 million (2007) had been set aside in the 2007-08 state budget for the Public Transport Authority to undertake preparation of the master plan for that segment of works.

Some of the groundwork for the works had been laid during construction of the Clarkson to Currambine extension, with the rail surface necessary to allow access to the Nowergup railway depot already constructed as a two track reserve. That was in addition to the planning for that section recognising the need to further extend the railway to areas further north, beyond the depot.

Construction of the extension commenced in 2011, with the opening of services planned for late 2014. By early 2014, works were running early, leading to a revised opening date of September 2014.

Butler to Yanchep extension
In the 2017 WA state budget, $441 million was allocated to build the extension, with preparation works starting in January 2020 and bulk earthworks to start by April 2020.

When opened, a journey time of 49 minutes is envisioned from Yanchep to the CBD, with up to 13,500 people expected to use the line every day.

References

Further reading

Public transport in Perth, Western Australia
Proposed railway lines in Australia